A root is the part of a plant, generally underground, that anchors the plant body, and absorbs and stores water and nutrients.

Root or roots may also refer to:

Art, entertainment, and media
 The Root (magazine), an online magazine focusing on African-American culture
 The Roots, a location in the video game Kya: Dark Lineage

Films
 Roots (film), a 1955 Mexican drama
 Poor Relatives, also released as Roots, a 2005 Russian film
 Roots, the English title for the 2019 Tamil film Sethum Aayiram Pon

Literature and stage plays
 Koreni (novel) (English: The Roots), a 1954 novel by Serbian author Dobrica Ćosić
 Roots (play), a 1958 play by Arnold Wesker
 Roots: The Saga of an American Family, a 1976 novel by Alex Haley about slavery in the United States

Music
 Root (chord), the fundamental note of a chord
 Roots music (disambiguation)

Groups and individuals
 Root (band), a Czech metal band
 Root (singer), a Japanese singer
 Root!, an Australian alt-country band
 The Roots, a hip-hop group from Philadelphia, Pennsylvania

Albums and EPs
 Roots (Idrees Sulieman album), 1958
 Roots (The Everly Brothers album), 1968
 Roots (Curtis Mayfield album), 1971
 Roots: John Lennon Sings the Great Rock & Roll Hits, 1975
 Roots (Slide Hampton album), 1985
 Roots (Sepultura album), 1996
 Roots (Cedar Walton album), 1997
 Root (album), 1999, by Thurston Moore
 Roots (Blue Mountain album), 2001
 Roots (Shawn McDonald album), 2008
 R.O.O.T.S., a 2009 album by Flo Rida
 Roots (Johnny Winter album), 2011
 Roots (Orla Gartland EP), 2013
 Roots (The Cavemen album), 2020
Roots, an album by Martin Fröst

Songs
 "Root", a song by Deftones on the 1995 album Adrenaline
 "The Root", a song by D'Angelo, on the 2000 album Voodoo
 "Roots", by the band Spunge on their 2002 album The Story So Far
 "Roots", a song on the 2006 Show of Hands album Witness
 "Roots" (Imagine Dragons song)
 "Roots", a 2016 song by the band Parmalee
 "Roots", by the band In This Moment on their 2017 album Ritual
 "Roots (World Junior Song)", a 2018 by The Reklaws
 "Roots", a 2019 song by Galantis and Valerie Broussard
 "R.O.O.T.S.", a 2009 song by Flo Rida

Television
 .hack//Roots, a 2006 anime series created by Bee Train
 "Roots", a 1990 episode of the American television sitcom Get a Life
 "Roots" (Haven), a television episode
 Root Sports, a sports television network in the United States
 "Root", code name of a fictional hacker in the TV series Person of Interest
 Roots (1977 miniseries), based upon the novel
 Roots: The Next Generations, a 1979 sequel miniseries also based upon the novel
 Roots: The Gift, a 1988 television film set between the second and third episodes of the original miniseries
 Roots (2016 miniseries), a remake of the 1977 miniseries
 "Roots", an episode of the television series One Day at a Time

Businesses
 Root, Inc., an American insurance company
 Roots Canada, a clothing brand with stores worldwide

Computing
 /root, the Unix superuser's home directory in the Filesystem Hierarchy Standard
 ROOT, an object-oriented multipurpose data analysis package
 root, a name for the superuser account in some operating systems
 Root directory, the first or top-most directory in a hierarchy
 Root node, the node in a tree data structure from which every other node is accessible
 ROOTS (software), a series of genealogy programs

Mathematics

 th root of a number
 Root of unity, a complex number which is an th root of one
 Root of an equation, a solution of the equation
 Root of a function, more meaningfully called zero of a function, an argument for which the function evaluates to zero
 Root of a polynomial, a zero of the corresponding polynomial function
 Digital root, the sum of a number's digits
 Any of the elements of a root system of vectors
 One designated vertex of a rooted tree in graph theory
 The root or base of a number system

Parts of objects
 Root of the hair
 Root of penis
 Wing root, an aircraft part
 The root of a mountain, in orogeny
 The bottom part of a tooth

People
 Root (surname), a family name
 Roots Manuva (born 1972), British rapper
 Rutaba Yaqub, Saudi Arabian singer, also known as "Roots"
 Root, Japanese singer from Strawberry prince
 Elmar Roots (1900-1962), Estonian veterinarian
 Byron Root Pierce (1829-1924), American dentist and American Civil War veteran

Places
 Root, Switzerland, a municipality in the district of Lucerne
 Root River (disambiguation)

United States
 Roots, Michigan, an unincorporated community in Henrietta Township, Jackson County
 Root, New York, a town in Montgomery County
 Roots, Pennsylvania, a census-designated place in Blair County

Other uses
 Root (board game), a game published by Leder Games
 Root (Chinese constellation)
 Root (linguistics), the core form of a word
 Roots, one's cultural heritage
 Root, Australasian slang for sexual intercourse

See also
 Root of all evil (disambiguation)
 Root cause (disambiguation)
 
 Rooter (disambiguation)
 Rootes (disambiguation)
 Rooting (disambiguation)
 Radix (disambiguation)
 Rut (disambiguation)
 Solution (disambiguation)